Jim Gillespie (13 July 1947 – 25 November 2016) was a Scottish professional footballer who played for Carlisle United, Whitburn, East Stirlingshire, Raith Rovers, Dunfermline Athletic and Alloa Athletic, as a winger.

References

1947 births
2016 deaths
Scottish footballers
Carlisle United F.C. players
Whitburn F.C. players
East Stirlingshire F.C. players
Raith Rovers F.C. players
Dunfermline Athletic F.C. players
Alloa Athletic F.C. players
Scottish Football League players
Association football wingers